Shannon is an American crime drama series starring Kevin Dobson that aired for nine episodes on CBS during the 1981–82 television season.

Cast
Kevin Dobson as Det. Jack Shannon

Episodes

References

External links

1981 American television series debuts
1982 American television series endings
CBS original programming
1980s American drama television series
Television shows set in San Francisco
Television series by Universal Television